The Wiley-Dondero Canal is a section of the St. Lawrence Seaway in New York, United States, with a length of . 
The US Army Corps of Engineers planned and supervised the Wiley-Dondero Canal to bypass the Long Sault. 
Actual construction was performed by Peter Kiewit Sons Co., Morrison-Knudsen Co., Perini Corp., Utah Construction Co., and Walsh Construction Co.
It is located  near Massena, New York.

Originally known as the Long Sault Canal, it was later renamed the Wiley-Dondero Canal. Construction was complicated by the need to not interrupt the waterflow to nearby hydro-electric installations.

References 

Saint Lawrence Seaway
Transportation buildings and structures in St. Lawrence County, New York
Canals in New York (state)